Fragrant is an unincorporated community located in Grayson County, Kentucky, United States.

References

Unincorporated communities in Grayson County, Kentucky
Unincorporated communities in Kentucky